Megalorchestia is a genus of sand-hoppers in the family Talitridae. The genus was erected by the German naturalist Johann Friedrich von Brandt in 1851 and the type species is Megalorchestia californiana.

Species
The World Register of Marine Species includes the following species in the genus:-

 Megalorchestia benedicti (Shoemaker, 1930)
 Megalorchestia californiana Brandt, 1851
 Megalorchestia columbiana (Bousfield, 1958)
 Megalorchestia corniculata (Stout, 1913)
 Megalorchestia dexterae Bousfield, 1982
 Megalorchestia minor (Bousfield, 1957)
 Megalorchestia pugettensis (Dana, 1853)

References

Gammaridea